Asunción Mixtepec Zapotec (North Central Zimatlan Zapotec) is a nearly extinct Oto-Manguean language of western Oaxaca, Mexico. It is a divergent Zapotec language, 22% intelligible with Ayoquesco Zapotec, the most similar other language.

References

Zapotec languages